Dora Mazzone (2 June 1969) is a Venezuelan actress.

Biography
Dora began her career in theater by performing stage readings. In 1984 she entered the School of Arts at the Central University of Venezuela. During the course of her studies, she participated in various stage plays in English, French, Italian and Spanish.

Her first acting breakthrough was in 1990 when she was selected to participate in the film by Román Chalbaud titled Cuchillos de fuego.

Dora has a  daughter named Graziella Simancas Mazzone from her marriage with actor Jean Carlo Simancas.

Filmography
 Corazón Esmeralda (2014) as Hortensia Palacios
 Mi ex me tiene ganas (2012) as Petra Paris
 Natalia del Mar (2011) as Pasionaría López
 Nadie me dirá como quererte (2008) as Antonia de Aristigueta 
 Y los declaro marido y mujer (2006) as Rosa Segarra de Mujica
 Amor a Palos (2005) as 
 Ser Bonita No Basta (2005) as
 Punto y raya (2004) as Ana María
 Estrambotica Anastasia (2004) as Agripina Samaniego de Borosfky
 La Cuaima (2003) as Modesta Meléndez
 Mi Gorda Bella (2002) as Angelica
 La mujer de Judas (2002) as Chichita Agüero del Toro
 La niña de mis ojos (2001) as Paula
 A Calzón Quitao (2001) as Paula
 Viva la Pepa (2001) as Yiya de Bencecry 
 Mariú (2000) as Tibizaida Morales
 Luisa Fernanda (1999) as Alicia Suárez
 Niña Mimada (1998) as Rosalía
 Maria de los Angeles (1997) as 
 Aire Libre (1996) as Ana Villahermosa 
 Sucre (1996) as Manuelita Sáenz
 Volver a Vivir (1996) as Mónica Guffanti
 Amores de Fin de Siglo (1995) as La mujer policía girana
 Entrega total (1995) as Trujillo
 Despedida de soltera (1995)
 Señora Bolero (1993)
 De Oro Puro (1993) as Virginia Cusiel
 Dulce Ilusión (1993) as Egleé Bustillo
 Por Estas Calles (1992) as Cecilia Matos
 Caribe (1990) as Aminta
 Disparen a matar (1990) as Gabriela
 Cuchillos de fuego (1990)

References

External links
 
 Dora Mazzone at [s6.zetaboards.com]

1969 births
Living people
Venezuelan people of Italian descent
Venezuelan stage actresses
Venezuelan film actresses
Venezuelan telenovela actresses